Stefan Glon (also known as Stefan Głon, July 2, 1908 – March 10, 1957) was a Polish boxer who competed in the 1928 Summer Olympics.

He was born in Berlin, German Empire and died in Żyrardów.

In 1928 he was eliminated in the first round of the bantamweight class after losing his fight to the upcoming silver medalist John Daley.

External links
sports-reference profile

Polski Komitet Olimpijski profile

1908 births
1957 deaths
Bantamweight boxers
Olympic boxers of Poland
Boxers at the 1928 Summer Olympics
Boxers from Berlin
Polish male boxers